Tieret is a city in Tunisia, part of Tataouine Governorate, located at 31.03°N, 10.17°E, elevation : 1220 ft

Populated places in Tunisia